This is a list of events from British radio in 1944.

Events

January
 No events.

February
 27 February – BBC General Forces Programme replaces the Forces Programme to provide entertainment suitable for American forces in Britain as well as British military and civilian audiences, including a large number of American network and Canadian Broadcasting Corporation programmes. It is also broadcast on shortwave frequencies of the BBC Overseas Service.

March
 No events.

April
 April – The American Broadcasting Station in Europe (ABSIE) is established, transmitting from Britain in English, German, French, Dutch, Danish, and Norwegian to resistance movements in mainland Europe.

May
 No events.

June
 5 June – One day before D-Day, the BBC transmits coded messages (including the second line of a poem by Paul Verlaine) from Britain to underground resistance fighters in France warning that the invasion of mainland Europe is about to begin.
 6 June – D-Day: The 08:00 BBC news bulletin announces that paratroops have landed in France (reporter Guy Byam is among them). 17 BBC reporters are embedded with the invasion forces. At 09:32 John Snagge begins reading announcements of the Normandy landings, broadcasting over BBC transmitters to home and overseas audiences and introducing a message from General Eisenhower. At 13:00, the first eyewitness report, recorded on a bomber, is broadcast. The King speaks to the nation at 21:00. Reports of the landings are carried by around 725 of the 914 broadcasting stations in the United States.

July
 28 July – Sir Henry Wood, aged 75, conducts his last Promenade Concert, evacuated to the Corn Exchange, Bedford.

August
 No events.

September
 17–26 September – Battle of Arnhem: BBC correspondents Guy Byam and Stanley Maxted, report from the scene.

October to December
 No events.

Debuts
 4 January – Much-Binding-in-the-Marsh (BBC General Forces Programme) (1944–1954)
 27 February – Variety Bandbox (BBC General Forces Programme) (1944–1952)
 6 June – War Report (BBC Home Service)

Continuing radio programmes

1930s
 In Town Tonight (1933–1960)

1940s
 Music While You Work (1940–1967)
 Sunday Half Hour (1940–2018)
 Desert Island Discs (1942–Present)

Births
 9 May – Tony Prince, "The Royal Ruler", born Thomas Whitehead, DJ
 12 May – Brian Kay, bass singer and radio music presenter
 5 June – Nigel Rees, radio broadcaster
 28 October – Gerry Anderson, Northern Irish radio broadcaster (died 2014)
 November – Jim Eldridge, scriptwriter
 25 December – Kenny Everett, born Maurice Cole, DJ (died 1995)

Deaths
 22 June – Kent Stevenson, war reporter (shot down while flying on an air raid)

See also 
 1944 in British music
 1944 in British television
 1944 in the United Kingdom
 List of British films of 1944

References 

 
Years in British radio
Radio